The Cyprus Rugby Federation (CRF) (Greek: Κυπριακή Ομοσπονδία Ράγκμπι, Κ.Ο.ΡΑ) the governing body for rugby union in Cyprus. It runs several competitions including a league with teams from the British military bases (Akrotiri, Episkopi and Dhekelia) and three local teams:
 Paphos Tigers
 Limassol Crusaders
 Nicosia Barbarians
 Larnaka Spartans

It became affiliated to FIRA in 2006. The CRF was accepted as an affiliated member of World Rugby in November 2014 

The first international game of the Cyprus Rugby National Team took place on March 24, 2007 against Greece in Paphos. The Cypriot XV won the game by 39-3 in front of 2,500 fans.
In October and November 2007, Cyprus  beat Azerbaijan, Monaco and Slovakia to win the FIRA 3D Tournament, a great achievement in their first year on the international scene. They lost the play-off game for promotion to level 3C on 6 September 2008 against Israel by a score of 23-14.  They remained in FIRA AER ENC Division 3D with Azerbaijan, Monaco, Slovakia and Bosnia Herzegovina until their recent victory against Bosnia.

See also
 Rugby union in Cyprus
 Cyprus national rugby union team

References

External links
 CRF homepage
 Paphos Tigers
 Limassol Crusaders

Rugby Federation
Rugby union in Cyprus
Rugby union governing bodies in Europe
Sports organizations established in 2006